Asclepias vestita is a species of milkweed known by the common name woolly milkweed. It is endemic to California, where it grows in many habitats across the state, from mountains to desert to valley. This is a robust perennial herb growing mostly upright or slightly bending. The thick leaves are oval to narrowly lance-shaped. The stem and leaves often have a coat of light-colored hairs, sometimes thick and woolly. The inflorescence is an umbel-shaped array to a spherical cluster of yellowish flowers. The flowers may be tinted with brown or purple. The fruit is a large yellowish follicle containing many silky-haired seeds.

External links
Jepson Manual Treatment
Photo gallery

vestita
Endemic flora of California
Flora of the California desert regions
Natural history of the California chaparral and woodlands
Natural history of the California Coast Ranges
Natural history of the Central Valley (California)
Natural history of the Mojave Desert
Natural history of the Transverse Ranges
Flora without expected TNC conservation status